Paul Marshall Gibson, Jr. (born January 4, 1960) is an American former professional baseball pitcher.

Career
The Cincinnati Reds drafted Gibson in the third round of the 1978 Major League Baseball draft, but released him in 1981. The Detroit Tigers signed him in May 1981. In December 1982, the Minnesota Twins took Gibson in the Rule 5 draft, but granted him free agency in 1984, whereupon the Tigers reacquired him.

Gibson made his major league debut on April 8, 1988, in a game against the Kansas City Royals. After the season he was honored as Tigers Rookie of the Year. In January 1992, the Tigers traded Gibson and minor leaguer Randy Marshall to the New York Mets for Mark Carreon and Tony Castillo. The Mets released Gibson in mid-1993, and he was signed by the New York Yankees. In 1994, the Yankees sent Gibson to the Milwaukee Brewers, who granted him free agency at the end of the season. The Toronto Blue Jays signed Gibson in April 1995, but released him in June. In July, the Pittsburgh Pirates signed Gibson but granted him free agency in October. The Yankees signed him again in December of that year but released him for the last time in May 1996.

Paul currently owns Paul Gibson's Baseball Academy in Long Island, New York. He was inducted into the Suffolk Sports Hall of Fame on Long Island in the Baseball Category with the Class of 1994.

Scouting career
Gibson is regarded as a projector scout, which envisions what a player will be able to do in a two- or three-year term. Despite the fact that Gibson had a successful pitching career, he has been able to analyze players' ability regardless their position. Gibson's style of scouting also looks for particular traits in a player's personality and character to ensure that they can handle pressure and be team leaders.

Beginning in 2006, Gibson served as an area scout supervisor for the Atlanta Braves. During his tenure with the Braves, he was in charge of all scouting aspects of amateur players in the Northeast.

In 2008, the Seattle Mariners' Director of Amateur Scouting, Tom McNamara, named Gibson as the Eastern Cross-Checker Scout for the organization. Gibson was part of a bigger plan in which he was expected to work closely with the Mariners baseball operations department and scouting staff in evaluating talent for the amateur draft.

In 2010, Gibson joined the Kansas City Royals scouting office as the National Scouting Supervisor.

Under Gibson’s supervision, the Royals signed Bubba Starling, Kyle Zimmer, Cameron Gallagher, and Alfredo Escalera–Maldonado, at 17, the youngest player ever drafted by any MLB organization since the insertion of the First-Year Player Draft.

Baseball instructor career
In 1995, Gibson opened a baseball training facility in Bellport, New York, with the intention to provide proper baseball instruction to young kids in the community in which he grew up. A year later, Gibson inaugurated a 10,000 square foot indoor facility that housed batting cages and small lesson areas for local instructors during the winter.

Infamous error card
Gibson's 1989 Score baseball card initially featured an "error" and was reprinted in a "corrected" form. On the card, Gibson is showing preparing to deliver the pitch as an infielder stands by second base. The first version shows the infielder grabbing his crotch. After the oddity was noticed by collectors, the card became briefly popular, especially after Score reissued the card with the infielder's arm airbrushed out.

References

External links
, or Retrosheet

1960 births
Living people
American expatriate baseball players in Canada
Atlanta Braves scouts
Baseball players from New York (state)
Birmingham Barons players
Calgary Cannons players
Cedar Rapids Reds players
Columbus Clippers players
Detroit Tigers players
Glens Falls Tigers players
Kansas City Royals scouts
Lakeland Tigers players
Major League Baseball pitchers
Nashville Sounds players
New York Mets players
New York Yankees players
Norfolk Tides players
Orlando Twins players
Seattle Mariners scouts
Shelby Reds players
Syracuse Chiefs players
Tampa Tarpons (1957–1987) players
Tiburones de La Guaira players
American expatriate baseball players in Venezuela
Tidewater Tides players
Toledo Mud Hens players